Sekkyô may refer to:

 Sawa Sekkyō, a Japanese ukiyo-e artist
 Sekkyô, a collection of Japanese poetry by Dakotsu Iida